Peter Doig (born 17 April 1959) is a Scottish painter. One of the most renowned living figurative painters, he has settled in Trinidad since 2002. In 2007, his painting White Canoe sold at Sotheby's for $11.3 million, then an auction record for a living European artist. In February 2013, his painting, The Architect's Home in the Ravine, sold for $12 million at a London auction. Art critic Jonathan Jones said about him: "Amid all the nonsense, impostors, rhetorical bullshit and sheer trash that pass for art in the 21st century, Doig is a jewel of genuine imagination, sincere work and humble creativity."

Early life
Peter Doig was born in Edinburgh, Scotland. In 1962 he moved with his family to Trinidad, where his father worked with a shipping and trading company, and then in 1966 to Canada. He moved to London to study at the Wimbledon School of Art in 1979–1980, Saint Martin's School of Art from 1980 to 1983, and Chelsea School of Art, in 1989–1990, where he received an MA. In 1989, the artist held a part-time job as a dresser at the English National Opera with his friend Haydn Cottam.

Doig was invited to return to Trinidad in 2000, to take up an artist's residency with his friend and fellow painter Chris Ofili. In 2002, Doig moved back to the island, where he set up a studio at the Caribbean Contemporary Arts Centre near Port of Spain. He also became a professor at the Fine Arts Academy in Düsseldorf, Germany.

Artistic practice
Many of Doig's paintings are landscapes, somewhat abstract, with a number harking back to the snowy scenes of his childhood in Canada. He draws inspiration for his figurative work from photographs, newspaper clippings, movie scenes, record album covers and the work of earlier artists like Edvard Munch. His landscapes are layered formally and conceptually, and draw on assorted historical artists, including Munch, H. C. Westermann, Friedrich, Monet and Klimt. While his works are frequently based on found photographs (and sometimes on his own) they are not painted in a photorealist style. Doig instead uses the photographs simply for reference. In a 2008 interview, Doig referred to his use of photographs and postcards as painting "by proxy" and noted that his paintings "made no attempt to reflect setting".

Shortly after Doig's graduation from the Chelsea College of Arts, he was awarded the prestigious Whitechapel Artist Prize culminating in a solo exhibition at the Whitechapel Art Gallery in 1991. Included in the Whitechapel exhibition were major works including Swamped (1990), Iron Hill (1991), and The Architect's Home in the Ravine (1991). The Architect's Home in the Ravine (1991) shows Eberhard Zeidler's modernist central Toronto home in the Rosedale ravine.

Doig created a series of paintings of Le Corbusier's modernist communal living apartments known as l’Unité d’Habitation located at Briey-en-Forêt, in France. In the early 1990s Doig was involved with a group of architects and artists who operated from the building. The modern urban structures are partially revealed and hidden by the forest that surrounds them. As Doig explains: "When you walk through an urban environment, you take the strangeness of the architecture for granted."

Created in the late 1990s, a series of paintings – including works such as Country-Rock (Wing Mirror) (1999) – depict a tunnel, a familiar landmark for Toronto residents since an anonymous artist painted a rainbow over it, at the northbound Don Valley Parkway, in 1972. The rainbow has been repainted more than 40 times over two decades, despite authorities’ attempts to remove it. His 1997 painting Canoe-Lake was inspired by the 1980 slasher film Friday the 13th.

In 2003, Doig started a weekly film club called StudioFilmClub in his studio together with Trinidadian artist Che Lovelace. Doig not only selects and screens the films; he also paints the poster advertising the week's film. He told an interviewer that he finds this ongoing project liberating because it is "much more immediate" than his usual work. In 2005, he was one of the artists exhibited in part 1 of The Triumph of Painting at the Saatchi Gallery in London.

Exhibitions
Doig has had major solo exhibitions at Tate Britain (2008), touring to Musée d'Art Moderne de la Ville de Paris and Schirn Kunsthalle Frankfurt, Dallas Museum of Art (2005), Pinakothek der Moderne, Munich (2004), Bonnefanten Museum, Maastricht (2003), and Whitechapel Art Gallery, London (1998). Doig's first major exhibition in his home country was entitled No Foreign Lands, taking place in the Scottish National Gallery, in Edinburgh, from 3 August to 3 November 2013. It was critically acclaimed and showed works created in the previous ten years, mostly during his residence in Trinidad. 

The Montreal Museum of Fine Arts, in collaboration with the Scottish National Gallery of Modern Art, presented his own exhibition, the first major held in North America, from 25 January to 4 May 2014. An retrospective opened at Fondation Beyeler, Basel, in 2014, which travelled in 2015 to Louisiana Museum of Modern Art in Humlebaek, Denmark. Also in 2015, an exhibition of recent works opened at Fondazione Bevilacqua La Masa in Venice, Italy, coinciding with the 56th Venice Biennale. Recently his work was included in the group exhibition Cooperations at Fondation Beyeler (2017). From 6 September to 16 November 2019, Michael Werner Gallery has hosted an exhibition of new paintings by Doig.

In February 2023 a four-month exhibition of new and recent works by Peter Doig opened at London’s Courtauld Gallery comprising 12 paintings and 20 works on paper. Most of these paintings were completed since his return from Trinidad in 2021, including Alpinist, Canal, Bather, Music Shop, House of Music (Soca Boat), Self-Portrait (Fernandes Compound) and Alice at Boscoe’s. He is the first contemporary artist to show at the Courtauld since its redevelopment and his display of painterly skills was widely admired by critics.

Collections
Doig is represented at many international museum collections, with famous paintings including The House that Jacques Built (1992) at the Tel Aviv Museum of Art; Boiler House (1994), at the San Francisco Museum of Modern Art; and Ski Jacket (1994), at Tate Modern, London. He is also represented at the British Museum, in London, Walker Art Gallery, in Liverpool, Southampton City Art Gallery, the National Galleries of Scotland, in Edinburgh, Musée National d'Art Moderne, in Paris, Bonnefanten Museum, in Maastricht, Goetz Collection, in Munich, Kunsthalle, in Nuremberg, Museo Cantonale d'Arte, in Lugano, Museu de Arte Moderna - Colecção Berardo, in Sintra, National Gallery of Canada, in Ottawa, Art Institute of Chicago, Museum of Modern Art, in New York, Metropolitan Museum of Art, in New York, Whitney Museum of American Art, in New York, National Gallery of Art, in Washington, The Hirshhorn Museum, in Washington, Philadelphia Museum of Art and Dallas Museum of Art, among other public collections.

Recognition
In 1993, Doig won the first prize at the John Moores exhibition with his painting Blotter. This brought public recognition, cemented in 1994, when he was nominated for the Turner Prize. From 1995 to 2000, he was a trustee of the Tate Gallery. He was honoured with amfAR’s Award of Excellence for Artistic Contributions to the Fight Against AIDS in 2009. He was also named the 2017 Whitechapel Gallery Art Icon.

Art market
In 2007, a painting of Doig's entitled White Canoe sold at Sotheby's for $11.3 million, then an auction record for a work by a living European artist. Paul Schimmel, chief curator at the Museum of Contemporary Art, Los Angeles said in an interview that the sale made Doig go from being "a hero to other painters to a poster child of the excesses of the market". In 2009, Night Playground (1997–98), a densely painted landscape painting being sold by Joel Mallin, a New York collector, went for $5 million at a Christie's auction in London, well above its high estimate of $3 million. Also at Christie's London, The Architect’s Home in the Ravine (1991) was auctioned at £7.66 million in early 2013. Later that year, César Reyes, a psychiatrist who lives in Puerto Rico and is one of the artist's biggest collectors, sold Jetty, a 1994 canvas of a lone figure on a dock at sunset, for $11.3 million. His painting Gasthof zur Muldentalsperre was sold at Christie's in 2014 for $17,038,276. This price was surpassed by Swamped, also sold at Christie's in 2015 for $25,950,000 and in 2021 for $39,000,000. Phillips auctioned Peter Doig's 1991 canvas, “Rosedale,” of a Toronto snowfall, which was guaranteed for $25 million and sold for $28.8 million to a telephone bidder, an auction high for the artist.

In 2016, a former Canadian corrections officer began a $5 million lawsuit against Doig over a picture he claimed was by Doig despite the artist's denial it was his work. A Chicago court ruled in Doig's favour later that year, finding that the painting was actually the work of a similarly named man, Peter Doige. In 2023, Doig was awarded $2.5 million in sanctions against the painting's owner, the art gallery representing the owner, and their lawyer.

References

Bibliography

 Derek Walcott, Morning, Paramin, Farrar, Straus and Giroux (2016),  
 Ulf Küster and Richard Shiff, Peter Doig, Hatje Cantz (2015), 
 Hilton Als, Stéphane Aquin, Angus Cook, Keith Hartley, Peter Doig: No Foreign Lands, Hatje Cantz (2013), 
 Richard Shiff, Peter Doig: Early Works, Michael Werner (2013), 
 Kevin Power, Peter Doig: New Paintings, Michael Werner (2012), 
 Catherine Lampert and Richard Shiff, Peter Doig, Rizzoli (2011), 
 Philip Hoare, Peter Doig: New Paintings, Michael Werner and Gavin Brown's enterprise (2009), 
 Judith Nesbitt (ed.), Peter Doig, Tate (2008), 
 Rudi Fuchs and Hans-Werner Schmidt, Go West Young Man, Walther Koenig (2007), 
 Catherine Grenier, Adrian Searle, and Kitty Scott, Peter Doig, Phaidon Press (2007), 
 Kadee Robbins (ed.), Peter Doig: Works on Paper, Rizzoli (2006)
 Nicholas Laughlin and Alice Koegel, Peter Doig: STUDIOFILMCLUB, Walther Koenig (2006), 
 Bernhard Schwenk and Hilke Wagner, Peter Doig: Metropolitain, Walther Koenig (2004), 
 
 Adrian Searle, Peter Doig: Works on Paper, Michael Werner (2002), 

1959 births
Living people
Artists from Edinburgh
Scottish landscape painters
20th-century Scottish painters
Scottish male painters
21st-century Scottish painters
21st-century Scottish male artists
Alumni of Chelsea College of Arts
Trinidad and Tobago painters
Academic staff of Kunstakademie Düsseldorf
Scottish contemporary artists
British emigrants to Trinidad and Tobago
Trinidad and Tobago people of Scottish descent
Alumni of Saint Martin's School of Art
Alumni of Wimbledon College of Arts
20th-century Scottish male artists